HMS Thames was a 32-gun fifth-rate  of the Royal Navy, launched in 1805 at Chatham.

Service history
Thames was expected to be commissioned by Captain John Loring but a delay in such meant that Thamess first captain was actually Captain Bridges Taylor, who commissioned Thames in November 1805. On 9 July 1806, Thames, Phoebe and Blanchewere directed towards Shetland to intercept French frigates that were menacing the fishing vessels. Thames initially served on the Downs Station before briefly serving on the Jamaica Station and in the Mediterranean from 3 March 1807. In April 1808 Thames returned to Portsmouth where Captain George Waldegrave assumed command and then sailed again for the Mediterranean. On 27 July 1810 Thames was serving alongside the sloops Pilot and HMS Weazel; together they drove an enemy convoy ashore at Amantea and took six gunboats, two large galleys, and twenty-eight transports with their subsequent landing parties. The destruction of the convoy halted Joachim Murat's planned invasion of Sicily. From June 1810 Thames served with the sloop Cephalus; on 16 June a convoy the ships had been following was found beached at Cetraro and a landing party of 180 men burned the entire convoy. After this command of Thames transferred to Captain Charles Napier.

On 20 July 1811 Thames and Cephalus attacked and captured the fort at Porto del Infrischi and in turn captured eleven gunboats, an armed felucca, and fourteen merchant vessels. In September Thames came under the orders of Captain Henry Duncan in HMS Imperieuse and together they captured ten Neapolitan gunboats at Palinuro on 2 November. In the spring of 1812 Napier became the senior naval officer on the coast of Calabria and as such Thames and Pilot captured Sapri on 14 May after a two-hour bombardment, capturing twenty-nine merchant vessels. In February 1813 it was found that the island of Ponza was a hub for enemy privateers and so on 16 February Thames and the frigate HMS Furieuse embarked two battalions of soldiers and landed them under fire at Ponza on 26 February. With support from the frigates the soldiers took the heights of the island, inducing its governor to surrender.

In April Captain John Purvis replaced Napier in command, taking Thames to Sheerness where she was refitted as a troopship between August 1813 and January 1814 to serve on the North America Station under the command of Commander Kenelm Somerville. In August 1814 Thames, now under Commander Charles Leonard Irby, participated in the expedition up the Patuxent River to attack the Chesapeake Bay Flotilla, which resulted in the burning of Washington. Under the rules of prize-money, Thames shared in the proceeds of the capture of the American vessels in the Battle of Lake Borgne on 14 December 1814. In May 1815 Thames returned to England under the command of Commander William Walpole and was broken up at Plymouth in October 1816.

Citations
Notes

Citations

References

External links
 Compilation of newspaper entries for HMS Thames by the late Paul Benyon

Fifth-rate frigates of the Royal Navy
1805 ships
Ships built in England
War of 1812 ships of the United Kingdom